Biosociology may refer to:
 biosocial theory, a theory in behavioral and social science
 sociobiology, a synthesis of scientific  disciplines